The Brookville Liberty Modern Streetcar, also known as the Brookville Liberty, is a streetcar built by Brookville Equipment Corporation since 2012. It is manufactured at Brookville's plant in Pennsylvania.

Design 
The Brookville Liberty Modern Streetcar is equipped with  onboard battery packs made up of rechargeable lithium-ion batteries, referred to as an onboard energy storage system (OESS), that enable it to operate off-wire. It is the first streetcar built in the United States capable of operating off-wire. Brookville president Marion Van Fosson referred to it as "the Prius of the modern streetcar market" due to its hybrid design that allows it to run on either battery power or via pantograph and catenary wires.

The streetcar is a 70% low-floor design that measures  in length and can seat 32 passengers; it is also capable of accommodating between 125 and 150 people while fully loaded. Empty, each car weighs .

Orders and deliveries 
In February 2013, Brookville signed a $9.4 million contract with Dallas Area Rapid Transit (DART) in Dallas for two Liberty Modern Streetcars to operate its Dallas Streetcar service between Union Station and Oak Cliff, making it the "first-ever American designed and manufactured off-wire capable streetcar to be delivered to a U.S. public transit agency". DART took delivery of its first Brookville streetcar in March 2015.

In June 2015, Brookville signed a contract with M-1 RAIL (later renamed the QLine) in Detroit to sell six Liberty Modern Streetcars for $32 million, its second order for the streetcars. On the Detroit line, the streetcars operate off-wire 60% of the time. The first two cars were scheduled for a late 2016 delivery in anticipation of the line's opening in spring 2017, and were followed by four more deliveries by spring 2017.

In November 2015, Milwaukee signed a four-car, $18.6-million contract with Brookville for its Lakefront Line, the third order for the streetcars. Milwaukee's cars feature bicycle racks as well as a climate-control system "adapted to meet the needs of Milwaukee's climate". Delivery of the streetcars is expected to begin in mid- to late 2017, with all four cars being delivered by early 2018.

In March 2016, Oklahoma City reached a final agreement with Brookville to purchase five streetcars, with an option for a sixth, at a cost of $24.9 million for its Oklahoma City Streetcar.

In 2017, Brookville was awarded a $33 million contract to deliver six Liberty Streetcars for use on the forthcoming Tempe Streetcar and a $26.5 million contract from Sound Transit for five streetcars to be operated on the Tacoma Link line. In 2018, Brookville secured the sale of two Liberty Modern Streetcars to Portland Streetcar, and a third car was added to the order in December of that year. Construction of the three Portland cars has been delayed, and as of spring 2021 delivery was projected for the end of 2022 or early 2023.

Accolades 
In October 2015, the Liberty Modern Streetcar won the Technical Innovation of the Year award at the Light Rail Transit Association's Global Light Rail Awards in London.

See also
Streetcars in North America

References

External links 

 

Liberty Modern Streetcar
Electric multiple units of the United States
Streetcars of the United States
Vehicles introduced in 2012
750 V DC railway electrification